India participated in World Games 2005 in Duisburg, Germany. The nation sent the smallest contingent out of any participating nation, with only two athletes going. No medals were won.

Athletes

References

2005
2005 in Indian sport
2005 World Games